Michael John-Ferrero Rose (born August 25, 1976) is an American former Major League Baseball catcher.

Drafted by the Houston Astros in the 5th round of the 1995 baseball draft Mike went on to play 15 professional seasons including Major League call ups with the A's,Cardinals and Dodgers. Mike was part of 3 minor league All Star teams, 4 minor league championships and a World Series Championship in 2006 with the St Loiuis Cardinals. Rose compiled 4,629 plate appearances 3,968 at bats over 1,000 career hits, 504 RBI and over 1,400 games played. Mike is now a full time father, coach and professional advisor.

References

External links

Baseball players from Sacramento, California
1976 births
Living people
Oakland Athletics players
Los Angeles Dodgers players
St. Louis Cardinals players
Major League Baseball catchers
Gulf Coast Astros players
Auburn Doubledays players
Kissimmee Cobras players
Quad Cities River Bandits players
Jackson Generals (Texas League) players
El Paso Diablos players
Trenton Thunder players
Tucson Sidewinders players
Wichita Wranglers players
Omaha Royals players
Sacramento River Cats players
Las Vegas 51s players
Durham Bulls players
Memphis Redbirds players
Buffalo Bisons (minor league) players
Long Island Ducks players
Chattanooga Lookouts players
Albuquerque Isotopes players
Edmonton Capitals players
Chico Outlaws players